Saralyn Ruth Daly (born May 11, 1924) is an American writer and translator.

Life
Daly was born on May 11, 1924 in Huntington, West Virginia. She earned a Ph.D from Ohio State University in English in 1950. The title of her doctoral dissertation was "The Historye of the Patriarks". After graduation she joined the faculty at Midwestern State University (then Midwestern University) in the early 1950s.

She was a professor at California State University, Los Angeles from 1962 to 1988, and is now Professor Emerita. During her tenure she received the outstanding professor award in the College of Arts and Letters at California State University, Los Angeles for the 1979–1980 academic year. She was also a professor of Linguistics at Texas Tech University.

Personal
Daly lives in Tujunga, California.

Awards
 1980 Harold Morton Landon Translation Award

Works
Her work appears in A Shout in the Street, Beyond Baroque, Bywords, Descant, Epos, Western Humanities Review.

Translations

 
 In the Web (Fawcett Books, 1978)
 Love's Joy, Love's Pain (Ballantine Books, 1983)

Criticism

References

1924 births
Living people
21st-century American women
Ohio State University Graduate School alumni
California State University, Los Angeles faculty
Texas Tech University faculty
Spanish–English translators
American women poets
Midwestern State University faculty
American translators
American women academics